Westringia rupicola is a species of plant in the mint family that is endemic to Australia.

Description
The species grows as a shrub with pendulous stems 30–50 cm in length. The oval to linear leaves are 2–4.5 mm long and 0.5 mm wide. The flowers are white to pale blue-lilac, with brownish dots.

Distribution and habitat
The species occurs in south-eastern Queensland, including the Springbrook and Lamington National Parks. It grows in crevices in steep rhyolite cliffs. Associated species include Leptospermum microcarpum and Melaleuca comboynensis.

Conservation
The species has been listed as Vulnerable under Australia's EPBC Act. The main threat to its habitat comes from invasive plants such as mistflower.

References

rupicola
Lamiales of Australia
Flora of Queensland
Taxa named by Stanley Thatcher Blake
Plants described in 1959